Alkimachos of Pydna, son of Neoptolemus, was a three-year-old child buried in Pydna (2nd/1st century BC). The epigraphy of the tomb stele declares that he was a descendant of Olympias, mother of Alexander the Great. Pydna is also a possible place for the tomb of Olympias.

References

Further reading
Wilson, Nigel Guy. Encyclopedia Of Ancient Greece. Routledge, 2006. 

Ancient Epirotes
Ancient Pydnaeans